Myre Church is a parish church of the Church of Norway in Øksnes Municipality in Nordland county, Norway. It is located in the village of Myre in the northern part of the island of Langøya. It is one of the churches for the Øksnes parish which is part of the Vesterålen prosti (deanery) in the Diocese of Sør-Hålogaland. The white, concrete church was built in a fan-shaped style in 1979 using plans drawn up by the architect Arne Aursand. The church seats about 300 people.

See also
List of churches in Sør-Hålogaland

References

Øksnes
Churches in Nordland
20th-century Church of Norway church buildings
Churches completed in 1979
1979 establishments in Norway
Fan-shaped churches in Norway
Concrete churches in Norway